Garbolc is a  settlement (village) in Szabolcs-Szatmár-Bereg county, Hungary. Garbolc is located near the easternmost geographical point (the Romanian-Ukrainian-Hungarian triple border point, see the photo; the triple point is 1 km eastward from the leg) of Hungary.

References

Populated places in Szabolcs-Szatmár-Bereg County